The AMT Lightning 25/22 was a .22 LR-caliber semi-automatic rifle manufactured by Arcadia Machine & Tool (AMT).

As is alluded to in the nomenclature, the Lightning 25/22 is functionally a clone of the Ruger 10/22 with the substitution of a larger 25-round magazine instead of the 10-round magazine used by Ruger. Also, the receiver is stainless steel rather than aluminum and features a Stainless Steel and Nylon folding stock and pistol grip rather than the wooden or composite stock mounted on the 10/22.  The rifle also features an extended magazine release.

The AMT Lightning line, which included direct clones of the Ruger 10/22 and Mark II pistol, eventually prompted a lawsuit against AMT that forced them to discontinue the line.

The AMT Lightning was also exported to the UK and tuned by Theoben Engineering, the result was the AMT/Theoben Target Model.  This rifle is known for its reliability; accuracy and rarity.  Produced in very small numbers this rifle had a bull target barrel and a special evolution moderator to fit the larger barrel (.917).

References

External links
 User Manual

.22 LR semi-automatic rifles